In the United States (US) Department of Defense, a beret flash is a shield-shaped embroidered cloth that is typically  tall and  wide with a semi–circular base that is attached to a stiffener backing of a military beret. These flashes—a British English word for a colorful cloth patch attached to military headgear—are worn over the left eye with the excess cloth of the beret shaped, folded, and pulled over the right ear giving it a distinctive appearance. The embroidered designs of the Army's beret flashes represent the heraldic colors and patterns of a unit with a unique mission or represent the history of the Army. The Air Force's beret flashes represent an Air Force specialty code (AFSC) with a unique mission. Joint beret flashes—such as those worn by the Multinational Force and Observers and the Joint Communications Support Element—are worn by all who are assigned, given their uniform regulations allow.

Army soldiers and non-commissioned officers (NCOs) affix their distinctive unit insignia (DUI), regimental distinctive insignia (when no DUI is authorized), Sergeant Major of the Army collar brass insignia (when assigned), or Senior Enlisted Advisor to the Chairman of the Joint Chiefs of Staff collar brass insignia (when assigned) to the center of their beret flash. Army warrant officers and commissioned officers affix their polished metal rank insignia to the center of their beret flash while general officer's may choose to affix regular or miniature polished metal rank insignia aligned to the center of both the beret flash and rank insignia. The exception to this are Army chaplains who affix their polished metal branch insignia to the center of their beret flash. Air Force commissioned officers who are in the security forces or are weather parachutists wear their beret flash in the same manner as the Army while tactical air control party (TACP) officers attach a miniature version of their polished metal rank insignia below the TACP Crest on the TACP Beret Flash. Other Air Force airman and NCOs assigned to the aforementioned AFSCs will wear either their beret flash or beret flash with crest.

The design of all US Department of Defense beret flashes are created and/or approved by The Institute of Heraldry, Department of the Army. When a requesting unit is entitled to have its own organizational beret flash, the institute will conduct research into the requesting unit's heraldry, as well as design suggestions from the requesting unit, in the creation of a unit or specialty–specific beret flash. Leveraging geometrical divisions, shapes, and colors a heraldic artist will create a design that will represent the history and mission of the requesting unit. Once the unit agrees upon a design, the institute will authorize the creation of the new beret flash and will establish manufacturing instructions for the companies authorized to produce heraldic materials. The institute will also monitor the production of the new beret flash to ensure quality and accuracy of the design is maintained.

Department of Defense beret flash history

US Army

1940s

Throughout its history, Army units have adopted different headgear and headgear devices—such as various colored cords, colored stripes, and insignias—to identify specific units, the unique mission of a unit, and/or the unique role of a soldier. According to some historians, the first US use of a military beret device was a beret flash created by the 509th Parachute Infantry Battalion. The 509th trained with the British 1st Airborne Division during World War II (WWII) and was made honorary members of the British airborne forces in 1943, entitling them to wear the maroon beret worn by British paratroopers. Some 509th paratroopers had a small hand–embroidered version of their regiment's gold and black pocket–patch created for use as their beret flash on their honorary maroon berets. The design of the 509th's pocket–patch, and their first organizational beret flash, depicts a stylized figure of a paratrooper standing at an open aircraft door wearing a reserve parachute with an artistic rendering of the number "509" surrounding the paratrooper's head and the name Geronimo displayed at the base of the door in title case.

1960s

The official start of the Army's beret flashes began in 1961 with Department of the Army Message 578636 authorizing the establishment of organizational beret flashes for wear on the special forces' rifle–green beret. The message also described who was authorized to wear the organizational beret flash stating that only special forces qualified paratroopers would be permitted to wear their special forces unit's organizational beret flash. These organizational beret flashes were to be worn centered over the left eye with either the 1st Special Forces Regiment DUI, polished metal officer rank insignia, or chaplain branch insignia positioned below their parachutist badge and centered on the beret flash.

1970s
Various beret accoutrements began to appear in the 1960s and 1970s, particularly between 1973 and 1979 when the Department of the Army had its morale–enhancing order in effect and different colored berets began to be worn by numerous units and branches of the Army.

Historical photographs from the 1960s through the 1970s show soldiers assigned to reconnaissance, ranger, and armor units informally wearing black berets with reconnaissance and ranger units affixing a wide variety of custom beret flashes that were worn over the left eye. In 1975, the Army formally authorized its ranger units to wear the black beret. If earned, some of these ranger units had their rangers affix their Ranger Tab to the top edge of their organizational beret flash along with their regiment or unit DUI, polished metal officer rank insignia, or chaplain branch insignia affixed to its center and worn over the left eye.

Wearing of the black beret by armor units expanded in the 1970s with some adopting organizational beret flashes. For example, many US Army armor units stationed in West Germany, such as the 1st Armored Division, 2nd Armored Cavalry Regiment, and 11th Armored Cavalry Regiment, began wearing black berets in the 1970s with the armored cavalry regiments affixing maroon and white ovals for use as their beret flash. The oval beret flash was worn vertically on the black beret behind their DUI to the left of their metal rank insignia or chaplain branch insignia and positioned over the left temple. Another example is the Army's "triple capability" experiment with the 1st Cavalry Division that outfitted the division for armor, airmobile, and air cavalry warfare in 1971. The division decided that its soldiers should wear different colored berets to represent the capability they brought to the division: black for armor, light–blue for infantry, red for artillery, and kelly–green for support—later settling for black berets across all formations. As they became available, 1st Cavalry soldiers would affix a battalion or squadron specific organizational beret flash of various shapes, colors, and materials to their beret. Historical photographs show many 1st Cavalry soldiers wearing their berets in the same manner as US armored cavalry soldiers in West Germany. The use of black berets extended to training units as well, such as the US Army Training and Doctrine Command and its armor school. Historical photographs of the era show plastic triangles being worn on black berets of Army Armor School cadre and were worn in the same manner as beret flashes are today.

In 1973, Army leaders authorized the wear of the maroon beret by airborne forces. Within a year or so, paratroopers of the 82nd Airborne Division began incorporating organizational beret flashes onto their maroon berets pattered after their unit's airborne background trimming. These organizational beret flashes, representing various units of the 82nd, were worn in the same manner as they are today.  Similarly, in 1974 Army leaders authorized the 101st Airborne Division to wear the dark–blue beret when it was reorganized into an air assault division at Fort Campbell. Army articles and historical photographs of 101st soldiers show them wearing organizational beret flashes patterned after their unit's airborne background trimming and were affixed with either their polished metal rank insignia, DUI, or chaplain branch insignia centered on the beret flash and worn over the left eye. Between 1976 and 1977, 101st soldiers would affix their Airmobile Badge—renamed Air Assault Badge in 1978—to their berets positioned over their left temple, next to their beret flash. Other Fort Campbell units of the era also wore the dark–blue beret as well as red for headquarters command and light-green for military police, all with traditional organizational beret flashes that were worn in the same manner as they are today.

Also during the 1970s, arctic–qualified soldiers of the 172nd Infantry Brigade wore locally authorized olive–drab berets with organizational beret flashes that were unique to each battalion, company, troop, or battery of the brigade and were worn in the same manner as they are today.

By 1979, the Army put a stop to the use of berets by conventional forces, leaving only special forces and ranger units the authority to wear berets.

1980s
In 1980, the Army reversed part of its decision allowing airborne units to wear maroon berets, ranger units black berets—which switched to tan berets in 2001—and special forces units rifle–green berets. The Army's 1981 uniform regulation describes the wear of these berets with the only authorized accoutrements being organizational beret flashes or recognition bars with officer rank insignia, chaplain branch insignia, or DUI affixed.

The organizational beret flash did not become the norm across the Army until 1984 when the recognition bar was discontinued after the Special Forces Tab became authorized for wear by special forces qualified paratroopers. Today, all paratroopers assigned to a special forces unit wear their unit's organizational beret flash on either a rifle–green beret, for special forces qualified paratroopers, or a maroon beret, for support paratroopers.

2000–present
In 2000, the Chief of Staff of the Army, General Eric Shinseki, decided to make the black beret the standard headgear of the Army. This was codified in regulations in 2001 and was amended in 2011 making the black beret optional headgear with certain uniforms. General Shinseki also decided that a new Department of the Army Beret Flash be worn on the black beret. According to The Institute of Heraldry, the Department of the Army Beret Flash is designed to resemble the flag of the Commander-in-Chief of the Continental Army—known as a general officer's or flag officer's standard—at the time of its victory at Yorktown in 1781; a light–blue flag with thirteen white six-point stars representing the Thirteen Colonies. According to Department of the Army Pamphlet 670–1, the Department of the Army Beret Flash is to be worn by all units "unless authorization for another flash was granted before implementing the black beret as a standard Army headgear".

Army units can request an organizational beret flash for their formation from The Institute of Heraldry given it is not for wear on the black beret. A good example of this is The Institute of Heraldry's 2018 authorization of organizational beret flashes for the Security Force Assistance Command and its brigades for wear on their brown beret.

In the 21st century, unlike the Department of the Army Beret Flash, Army organizational beret flashes often signify a specific formation of a specialized unit, such as an active airborne, ranger, special forces, or combat advisor unit. However, there is a unique generic Special Forces Beret Flash worn by special forces paratroopers on their rifle–green beret when assigned to a unit not authorized an organizational beret flash; this is due to the rifle–green beret representing a paratrooper's special forces qualification—in addition to the Special Forces Tab—rather than a special forces unit as it once did in the 60s, 70s, and early 80s.

US Air Force
Weather Parachutists

In the mid 1960s, Air Force commando weathermen, formally known as weather parachutists, with Detachment 26 of the 30th Weather Squadron and Detachment 32 of the 5th Weather Squadron informally wore black berets. A black cloth rectangle with a yellow embroidered anemometer surmounted by a fleur–de–lis with the words "Combat Weather" split by the anemometer was used as their beret flash. From 1970 through the 1980s, weather parachutists with the 5th Weather Squadron wore maroon berets with an Army style beret flash that incorporated the squadron's design and colors from their emblem's alchemical symbol for water and affixed their Parachutist Badge to the flash. In 1979, weather parachutists were authorized to wear navy–blue berets with an Army style beret flash consisting of a blue and black field surrounded by yellow piping. Enlisted and NCOs affixed their Parachutist Badge to the flash while officers affixed their polished metal rank insignia. In 1986, the gray beret was authorized for wear by weather parachutists who continued to wear the aforementioned cloth beret flash until a new large color metallic Special Operations Weather Team Crest was authorized. In 1992, the Air Force approved the return of the weather parachutist's blue, black, and yellow beret flash from the 1970s and affixed their large color metallic Special Operations Weather Team Crest to it.

In 1996, weather parachutists assigned to Air Force Special Operations Command (AFSOC) began wearing a new Army style beret flash, known as the Special Operations Weather Team Beret Flash, while those assigned to Air Combat Command, known as Combat Weather Teams, continued to wear the blue, black and yellow beret flash. The Special Operations Weather Team Beret Flash consisted of a red border representing the blood shed by their predecessors, a black background representing special operations, and three diagonal lines of various colors representing the services they supported (green=Army, purple=joint forces, and blue=Air Force). Enlisted and NCOs affixed their Parachutist Badge to the Special Operations Weather Team Beret Flash while officers affixed their polished metal rank insignia until 2002 when the Combat Weather Team Crest was created. The Combat Weather Team Crest was affixed to both Special Operations Weather Team and Combat Weather Team Beret Flashes by enlisted and NCOs while officers continued to affix their polished metal rank insignia. In 2007/2008, the Special Operations Weather Team Beret Flash stopped being worn and in 2009—when the Special Operations Weather AFSC was established—a new large polished metallic Special Operations Weather Crest was approved for wear by special operations weather teams, with a modified version of the crest being worn by the now redesignated special reconnaissance airman in 2019.

Security Forces

In 1966/67, the newly formed 1041st Security Police Squadron was authorized to wear a dark–blue beret with a unique organizational beret flash. The 1041st's beret flash has a depiction of a white falcon carrying a pair of lightning bolts on a somewhat pointed oval-shaped light–blue cloth shield that was worn over the left temple. In 1976, the Air Force approved the navy-blue beret, worn by the Strategic Air Command Elite Guard and Air Force Combat Control Teams, as the official uniform item for all Air Force police and security forces.

In 1997, the Air Force stood up the security forces AFSC and honored the heraldry of the 1041st Security Police Squadron by creating a new organizational beret flash for all security forces airman and NCOs. The new Security Forces Beret Flash depicts the 1041st's falcon over an airfield on a blue shield–shaped patch bordered in gold with a white scroll at its base embroidered with the motto "Defensor Fortis" (defenders of the force) in dark–blue title case. Security forces officers wear the same basic beret flash minus the embroidered falcon and airfield and in its place affix their polished metal rank insignia.

TACPs

In 1979, TACP airman and NCOs were given authorization to wear the black beret. In 1984, two TACP's submitted a design for a unique beret flash and crest for wear on their berets which the Air Force approved one year later. The TACP Beret Flash consists of a scarlet border that represent the firepower TACP's bring to bear with two dovetailed fields of blue and green representing the close working relationship between the Air Force and the Army that is enabled by the TACP. TACP officers also wear the TACP Beret Flash and Crest but with miniature polished metal rank insignia below the crest and just above the inner–border of the beret flash.

Air liaison officers assigned to an air support operations squadron or group can also be given authorization to wear the black beret and TACP Beret Flash with full-size polished metal officer rank insignia (no crest).

Some Air Mobility Liaison Officers also wore the black beret.  Although worn informally before then, in 2015 The Institute of Heraldry authorized a slight modification of the TACP Beret Flash for wear by Air Mobility Liaison Officers, incorporating an embroidered compass rose in the upper–left corner of the flash. The Air Mobility Liaison Officer Beret Flash was worn in the same manner as Air Liaison Officers wear the TACP Beret Flash.

Combat Aviation Advisors

From 2018–2022, AFSOC authorized the wear of the brown beret for airman, NCOs, and officers assigned to what was known as combat aviation advisor squadrons, such as the 6th and 711th Special Operations Squadrons. The brown beret—similar to the Army's brown beret—was worn with an Army style organizational beret flash consisting of a blue field with olive–green diagonal stripes and border. The Combat Aviation Advisor Beret Flash was worn centered over the left eye with polished metal officer rank insignia, chaplain branch insignia, or an AFSC metallic beret crest affixed to the beret flash while all other advisors wore it without accoutrements.

US Navy
In the 1960s, select US Navy riverine patrol units operating in South Vietnam adopted the black beret to be part of their daily uniform and wore various accouterments on their berets. In 1967, the Commander of the Riverine Patrol Force sent an official message to the Commander of River Patrol Flotilla Five authorizing the wear of the black beret. In this message, the wear and appearance of the beret was defined stating, "Beret will be worn with river patrol force insignia centered on right side" and "Only standard size river patrol force insignia will be worn on beret. ... No other emblem or rank insignia will be displayed on beret." Today, these US Navy small boat units honor their heritage by wearing the black beret during special occasions—such as induction ceremonies into the Gamewardens Association—and will affix historically relevant riverine task force insignia for use as their beret flash.

Beret flashes of the US military

Joint

Obsolete

Air Force

Obsolete

Army

Adjutant general
Obsolete

Air defense artillery

Obsolete

Armor and cavalry

Obsolete

Aviation

Obsolete

Chemical
Obsolete

Civil affairs

Obsolete

Engineers

Obsolete

Field artillery

Obsolete

Infantry

Obsolete

Logistics

Obsolete

Medical

Obsolete

Military intelligence

Obsolete

Military police

Obsolete

Multidisciplinary units

Obsolete

Ordnance

Psychological operations

Obsolete

Public affairs

Signal

Obsolete

Special forces

Obsolete

Training

Obsolete

State defense forces

The state defense forces—also known as state guard, state military reserve, or militia—in many US states and territories wear modified versions of Army uniforms. To help separate state guard units from Army units, such as the Army National Guard, they will often wear unique name tape, badges, shoulder sleeve insignia, and/or headgear. If the militia unit chooses to wear the Army black beret, a unique organizational beret flash is worn to help further distinguish them from Army units. These state military reserve organizational beret flashes are worn in the same manner as Army beret flashes are today. The following is a list of some organizational beret flashes worn by various state and territory militias:

State or territory specific

Obsolete

See also
 Uniforms of the United States Army
 Uniforms of the United States Air Force
 Uniforms of the United States Navy
 Badges of the United States Army
 Badges of the United States Air Force
 Obsolete badges of the United States military

References

Heraldry of the United States military
Heraldry of the United States Army